Richard M. Sommer is a Professor of Architecture and Urbanism and the Director of the Global Cities Institute at the John H. Daniels Faculty of Architecture, Landscape, and Design, University of Toronto. From 2009 until 2020, he was the Dean of the Daniels Faculty. Sommer was born in Philadelphia, and now resides in Toronto, Canada. Trained as an architect and urbanist, Sommer is a leader in architectural education and is a designer and scholar of the built environment.

Career 
As Director of the Global Cities Institute at Daniels Faculty, Sommer co-curated the study and exhibitions with Michael Piper, Housing Multitudes: Reimagining the Landscapes of Suburbia held at the Daniels Architecture and Design Gallery and at the World Urban Pavilion at Regent Park in 2023. Housing Multitudes features work by University of Toronto faculty, students and local architectural practice, LGA Architectural Partners, proposing solutions for how suburban geography can evolve to accommodate additional housing and also contribute to a more social and sustainable future.

Whilst serving as Dean of the Daniels Faculty, Sommer led the transformation of 1 Spadina Crescent into the Daniels Building, designed by NADAAA. The project won numerous awards including a Toronto Urban Design Award. Sommers expanded the Daniels Faculty, adding five new programs including a renewed undergraduate program in Architectural Studies, a PhD in Architecture, Landscape, and Design, and amalgamating University of Toronto's programs in Art/Visual Studies and Forestry. Sommer co-curated, with Pillow Culture NYC, the inaugural exhibition at the Architecture and Design Gallery, New Circadia (Adventures in mental spelunking) based on ongoing research on the democratic potential of collective spaces of idling, dream sharing and rest. 

Prior to his appointment as Dean at the Daniels Faculty, Sommer was a member of the faculty at the Harvard Graduate School of Design for eleven years, and served as Director of the school's Urban Design programs. He has held several other academic appointments including the O’Hare Chair/Visiting American Scholar at the University of Ulster, Scholar-in-Residence at the California College of the Arts, as well as visiting professorships at the Cooper Union, K.U. Leuven, Washington University, Columbia University and Iowa State University. In 1995 he co-founded a design practice: borfax/B.L.U. Sommer has served as a visiting critic and lectured internationally.

Education 
Sommer received a Bachelor of Architecture and a Bachelor of Fine Arts from Rhode Island School of Design, and a Master of Architecture at Harvard University's Graduate School of Design, where the architect Jose Rafael Moneo served as his thesis advisor.

Awards 
In 2020 Sommer received a Distinguished Professor Award from The Association of Collegiate Schools of Architecture. In 1994 he was awarded Harvard's Arthur W. Wheelwright Traveling Fellowship (now called the Wheelwright Prize). In 1991 he received the Legislative Award for Teaching Excellence from Iowa State University.

Sommer's research has been supported by awards and grants including: the National Endowment for the Arts, the LEF Foundation, the Wheelwright Fellowship, the Tozier Fund and the Graham Foundation for Advanced Studies in the Fine Arts.

See also 

 University of Toronto
 John H. Daniels Faculty of Architecture, Landscape, and Design
 New Circadia

References

External links 
 Dy-no-mite Fiends: The Weather Underground at Chicago's Haymarket by Richard M. Sommer with Glenn Forley
 Four Stops along an Architecture of Postwar America, Richard M. Sommer, Perspecta, Vol. 32, Resurfacing Modernism (2001), pp. 76
Daniels Faculty of Architecture, Landscape, and Design
Housing Multitudes at The University of Toronto imagines the future of Suburbia

Architects from Philadelphia
Living people
Harvard Graduate School of Design faculty
Academic staff of the University of Toronto
Harvard Graduate School of Design alumni
Year of birth missing (living people)
Rhode Island School of Design alumni